The Kori Nuclear Power Plant (Korean: 고리원자력발전소, Hanja: 古里原子力發電所) is a South Korean nuclear power plant located in Kori, a suburban village in Busan. It is the world's largest fully operational nuclear generating station by total reactor count and the number of currently operational reactors since 2016, after it exceeded in nameplate capacity Canada's Bruce Nuclear Generating Station. It is owned and operated by Korea Hydro & Nuclear Power, a subsidiary of KEPCO. The first reactor began commercial operation in 1978 and operated until 2017 when it was decommissioned. Units 2, 3, and 4 started commercial operations in the 1980s. All reactors on site are pressurized water reactors.

Reactors
An expansion of the plant begun in 2006 added four new Korean-sourced reactors, the so-called Shin Kori reactors (shin meaning "new"). The first pair of Shin Kori reactors are of the OPR-1000 design, while the second two are the APR-1400 design. Shin Kori 1 and 2 achieved commercial operations in 2011 and 2012 respectively, with Shin Kori 3 and 4 achieving commercial operations in 2016 and 2019. Construction on two further APR-1400 reactors, known as Shin Kori-5 and Shin Kori-6, was started in April 2017 and September 2018, respectively.

In November 2019, the reactor pressure vessel of the 1340MWe APR-1400 reactor to be housed in Shin Kori 5 was installed. As of November 2019, construction on the Shin Kori 5 and 6 was 51 percent complete.

Kori Nuclear Power Plant became the largest operating nuclear power plant in the world by nameplate capacity after the commissioning of Shin Kori 4. Only the Kashiwazaki-Kariwa Nuclear Power Plant has a larger nameplate capacity, though it was idled after the 2011 Fukushima Daiichi nuclear disaster and has not been restarted as of 2021.

Kori-1 was shutdown in June 2017 in advance of decommissioning beginning in 2022 after its spent nuclear fuel is removed. Decommissioning will take 15 years to complete and will cost an estimated KRW719.4 billion (US$639.5 million).

Incidents

Minor incidents 

On 9 February 2012, during a refueling outage, loss of off-site power (LOOP) occurred and emergency diesel generator (EDG) 'B' failed to start while EDG 'A' was out of service for scheduled maintenance, resulting in a station blackout (SBO). Off-site power was restored 12 minutes after the SBO condition began.

The LOOP was caused by a human error during a protective relay test of the main generator. The EDG 'B' failing to start was caused by the failure of the EDG air start system. Further investigation revealed that the utility did not exercise proper control of electrical distribution configuration to ensure the availability of the Station Auxiliary Transformer (SAT) while conducting test on the Unit Auxiliary Transformer (UAT).

After restoring off-site power through the SAT, the operators eventually recovered shutdown cooling by restoring power to a residual heat removal pump. During the loss of shutdown cooling for 19 minutes, the reactor coolant maximum temperature in the hot leg increased from 37℃ to 58.3℃ (approximately 21.3℃ rise), and the spent fuel pool temperature slightly increased from 21℃ to 21.5℃.
There was no adverse effect on the plant safety as a result of this event, no radiation exposure to the workers, and no release of radioactive materials to the environment. However, inconsistent with the requirements, the licensee did not report the SBO event to the regulatory body in a timely manner and did not declare the "alert" status of the event in accordance with the plant emergency plan. The licensee reported this event to the regulatory body about a month after the event had occurred.

On 2 October 2012 at 8:10 a.m., Shin Kori-1 was shut down after a warning signal indicated a malfunction in the control rod system which triggered an investigation  to verify the exact cause of the problem.

In June 2013, Kori-2 was shutdown, and Kori-1 ordered to remain offline, until safety-related control cabling with forged safety certificates is replaced. Control cabling installed in the APR-1400s under construction failed flame and other tests, so need to be replaced delaying construction by up to a year.

In October 2013, cable installed in Shin Kori-3 failed safety tests, including flame tests. Replacement with U.S. manufactured cable delayed the startup of the plant, which eventually entered commercial operation 3 years late.

See also

Nuclear power in South Korea
List of nuclear reactors in South Korea

References

External links
 
Kori plant overview

Nuclear power stations in South Korea
Nuclear power stations with reactors under construction
1978 establishments in South Korea
Energy infrastructure completed in 1978